Valentin Perko (born April 8, 1950 in Ljubljana), Slovenian cinematographer and director of photography. He is the son of the painter Lojze Perko, and brother of painter Tomaž Perko and psychologist Andrej Perko.
Perko obtained a degree in photography in 1977 at FAMU in Prague, Czech Republic (Filmová a Televizní Fakulta Akademie Múzických Umění v Praze). His career took off as a cinematographer of documentary and commercial films, while also being active in television production. His works include many short and feature films with various directors.
Perko's cinematographical expressive style is especially evident in the following films: Dih (1983), Maja in vesoljček (1988), Do konca in naprej (1990), Triangel (1991), Morana (1993), Ekspres, ekspres (1996), Brezno (1998) and television film Pet majskih dni (1997). 
He is the cinematographer of awarded experimental film Valcer za Tavžentarjeva dva (1981), followed by Učna leta izumitelja Polža (1982), Nobeno sonce (1984), Sonce za dva (1986), Cpprnica Zofka (1988), Herzog (1995), Napisan list (2000), and Director of Photography in Petelinji zajtrk (2007). Television films include Paralele (1987), Vaški učitelj (1993), Steber (1997) and 5 episodes TV series Novi svet (2003).
Since 2009 Valentin Perko has worked as a senior lecturer at AGRFT (Slovenian Academy for Theatre, Television, Radio and Film, Ljubljana, Slovenia) and is also Dean of Camera Department.

Filmography (Director of Photography)

List of awards and rewards 
1980, Special award Metoda Badjura, Celje
1988, Award Metoda Badjura with degree, Celje
1991, Golden award Metoda Badjura, Celje
1993, silver award Metoda Badjura, Portorož
1997, Award for cinematography for Herzog and Ekspres, ekspres, Portorož
1997, Kodak award for cinematography, Portorož
2007, Jože Babič award, RTV Slovenia

Sources 
Enciklopedija Slovenije. (2002). Book 16. Ljubljana: Mladinska knjiga.
"Katedra za kamero". AGRFT. Pridobljeno dne 17.3.2015.
"sodelavci visokošolski učitelji in sodelavci". 17.3.2015. AGRFT.

Festival evropskega in mediteranskega filma
Praška filmska škola

Slovenian cinematographers
1950 births
Living people